Karenni may refer to:

 Karenni people
 Karenni language
 Karenni State, former name of Kayah State, Myanmar
 Karenni States, an area of present-day Kayah State, Myanmar